Erwin George "Cannon Ball" Baker (March 12, 1882 – May 10, 1960) was an American motorcycle and automobile racing driver and organizer in the first half of the 20th century. Baker began his public career as a vaudeville performer, but turned to driving and racing after winning a dirt-track motorcycle race in Crawfordsville, Indiana, in about 1904.

Baker was also famous for his record-setting point-to-point drives, in which he was paid to promote the products of various motorcycle and automobile manufacturers.

In 1908, Baker purchased an Indian motorcycle and began entering and winning local races. His most famous victory came in 1909 at the first race ever held at the newly built Indianapolis Motor Speedway. Baker also raced at the 1922 Indianapolis 500, placing 11th in a Frontenac. He later became the first commissioner of NASCAR. Baker was inducted into the Indianapolis Motor Speedway Hall of Fame in 1981, the Motorsports Hall of Fame of America in 1989, and the American Motorcyclist Association Motorcycle Hall of Fame in 1998.

Life
Baker was born in Dearborn County, Indiana, in 1882. In January 1912, he left Indianapolis on a two-speed Indian and covered  in three months, traveling through Florida, down to Cuba and Jamaica, and then to Panama. He took a steamer up to San Diego where he based himself for a while and from there he competed in several endurance runs in both California and Arizona. It was during this time that Baker decided he would attempt to break the transcontinental record. After a record-setting transcontinental drive in 1914, he received his nickname "Cannon Ball" from a New York newspaper writer who compared him to the Cannonball Express train of the Illinois Central made famous by Casey Jones.

Records
Baker set 143 driving records from the 1910s through the 1930s. His first was set in 1914, riding coast to coast on an Indian motorcycle in 11 days. He normally rode to sponsor manufacturers, guaranteeing them "no record, no money".

In 1915, Baker drove from Los Angeles to New York City in 11 days, 7 hours and fifteen minutes in a Stutz Bearcat, and the following year drove a Cadillac 8 roadster from Los Angeles to Times Square in 7 days, 11 hours, and 52 minutes, while accompanied by an Indianapolis newspaper reporter. For ReVere, he drove a car that might have been the first work's prototype vehicle on a very extended reliability, endurance, and promotion run. The trip took about four months from June to September 1918, went over 16,234 miles and connected the 48 state capitals. In 1924, he made his first midwinter transcontinental run in a stock Gardner sedan at a time of 4 days, 14 hours, and 15 minutes. He was so impressed by the car that he purchased one thereafter. In 1926, he drove a loaded two-ton truck from New York to San Francisco in a record 5 days, 17 hours, and 30 minutes, and in 1928, he beat the 20th Century Limited train from New York to Chicago. Also in 1928, he competed in the Mount Washington Hillclimb Auto Race, and set a record time of 14:49.6 seconds, driving a Franklin.

His best-remembered drive was a 1933 New York City to Los Angeles trek in a Graham-Paige model 57 Blue Streak 8, setting a 53.5 hour record that stood for nearly 40 years. This drive inspired the later Cannonball Baker Sea-To-Shining-Sea Memorial Trophy Dash, better known as the "Cannonball Run", which itself inspired at least five movies and a television series. In 1941, he drove a new Crosley Covered Wagon across the nation in a trouble free  run to prove the economy and reliability characteristics of Crosley automobiles. Other record and near-record transcontinental trips were made in Model T Fords, Chrysler Imperials, Marmons, Falcon-Knights, and Columbia Tigers, among others.

Death
Baker died of a heart attack at Community Hospital in Indianapolis, Indiana, on May 10, 1960, at age 78. He is buried at Crown Hill Cemetery in Indianapolis.

Historical marker
In 2017, an Indiana state historical marker commemorating "Cannon Ball" Baker was installed by the Indiana Historical Bureau in front of Baker's home at 902 East Garfield Drive in Indianapolis. The home overlooks Garfield Park.

Indy 500 results

Car and Driver "Cannonball Run"
In the 1970s, Car and Driver magazine reporter Brock Yates and editor Steve Smith conceived the idea of an unsanctioned, informal race across the country, replicating the 53.5-hour transcontinental drive made by Baker in 1933. The New York to Los Angeles Cannonball Baker Sea-To-Shining-Sea Memorial Trophy Dash, later shortened to the "Cannonball Run", was staged in 1971, 1972, 1975, and 1979. The stunt served as the inspiration for several Hollywood movies, such as Cannonball!, The Gumball Rally, The Cannonball Run, Cannonball Run II, and Cannonball Run III.

See also
NASCAR National Commissioner

References

External links

 Motorcycle Hall of Fame
 Indiana Motorcycle Historical Society
 
 "Indiana’s Daredevil Racer: Erwin 'Cannon Ball' Baker and his 1914 Record-Breaking Transcontinental Motorcycle Run", Indiana Historical Bureau

1882 births
1960 deaths
American motorcycle racers
Indianapolis 500 drivers
NASCAR commissioners
NASCAR people
Burials at Crown Hill Cemetery
People from Dearborn County, Indiana
Racing drivers from Indiana